Leiksandin is a village in Amarapura Township, Mandalay District, in the Mandalay Region of central Burma.It is located 8 miles south of Amarapura and had a population of 310 in 1891 and was reported to have paid RS. 390 in thathameda tax.

References

Populated places in Mandalay District
Amarapura Township